The Georgian Futsal League is the premier  futsal league in Georgia, organized by Georgian Football Federation.

Champions

External links
UEFA 
Futsalplanet 

Futsal competitions in Georgia (country)
futsal
Georgia
1994 establishments in Georgia (country)
Sports leagues established in 1994